The A594 is a main road in Cumbria, that runs between the A596 in Maryport and the A595 on the outskirts of Cockermouth.

Curiously, the inner ring road in Leicester is also numbered as the A594.

History
The original route of the A594 was from Maryport to Penrith via Cockermouth, Keswick, Threlkeld, Penruddock and Greystoke.  This route is now mostly parts of the A66, A591, A5271 and the B5288 roads.  The road number changed to coincide with the opening of the M6 motorway through what is now Cumbria.

External links
SABRE Roads page on the A594
The route of the A594 on Google Maps

Roads in Cumbria